Leucanopsis polyodonta is a moth of the subfamily Arctiinae. It was described by George Hampson in 1901. It is found in French Guiana, Brazil and the Amazon region.

References

 

polyodonta
Moths described in 1901